Blow-Up and Other Stories is a collection of short stories, selected from the short fiction of the Argentinian author Julio Cortázar.  It was originally published in hardcover as End of the Game and Other Stories.  The title story of the paperback collection served as inspiration for Michelangelo Antonioni's film Blowup.

Contents 

One
Axolotl
House Taken Over
The Distances
The Idol of the Cyclades
Letter to a Young Lady in Paris
A Yellow Flower
Two
Continuity of Parks
The Night Face Up
Bestiary
The Gates of Heaven
Blow-Up
Three
End of the Game
At Your Service
The Pursuer
Secret Weapons

References 

Short story collections by Julio Cortázar
1967 short story collections
Short stories set in Paris
Pantheon Books books
Postmodern novels